Francesco Falaschi (born 6 August 1961) is an Italian film director and screenwriter.

He won the David di Donatello for Best Short Film for Quasi fratelli in 1999. He was nominated for a David di Donatello and a Silver Ribbon for Best New Director in 2003 for his first film I Am Emma.

Filmography
Corti stellari – segment Furto con destrezza (1997) – short film
Quasi fratelli (1998) – short film
Adidabuma (1999) – short film
I Am Emma (2002)
Last Minute Marocco (2007)
Questo mondo è per te (2011)
As Needed (2018)
Ho tutto il tempo che vuoi (2020) – short film

References

External links

1961 births
Living people
Italian film directors
Italian screenwriters
People from Grosseto
David di Donatello winners
Italian male screenwriters